Iliac vessels can refer to:

 Iliac artery
 Iliac vein